Hiroshi Shimizu  may refer to:
Hiroshi Shimizu (director) (1903–1966), Japanese film director
Hiroshi Shimizu (director born 1964), Japanese film director, 1998 Toronto International Film Festival
Hiroshi Shimizu (professor), professor at Keio University, project leader of Eliica
Hiroshi Shimizu (animator), Japanese animator